The IAAF Hall of Fame was established by the International Association of Athletics Federations (since 2019: World Athletics) in 2012. It is intended to honor individuals who have made valuable contributions in the sport of athletics both internationally and in their home countries that match certain criteria.

The inaugural class, composed of 24 individuals, was introduced in November 2012.

Criteria
The minimum criteria for an athlete to qualify for membership of the Hall of Fame are:
 Athletes must have won at least two gold medals at the Summer Olympics or World Championships in Athletics,
 Athletes must have set at least one World record,
 Athletes must have been retired for at least 10 years at the time of election to the IAAF Hall of Fame.
These criteria may be extended in 2013 to allow athletes whose achievements had an extraordinary impact on the sport to be considered as well.

Members
These are the 48 members as of 21 November 2014.

See also
World Athlete of the Year

References

External links
IAAF Hall of Fame

Sports halls of fame
Awards established in 2012
Halls of fame in Monaco
2012 establishments in Europe
Hall of Fame